USS Kaskaskia (AO-27) was a  fleet replenishment oiler serving in the United States Navy, named for the Kaskaskia River in Illinois.

Kaskaskia was launched 29 September 1939 by the Newport News Shipbuilding & Drydock Company, Newport News, Virginia; sponsored by Mrs. Joseph P. Kennedy; acquired by the Navy from Esso Oil Company, 22 October 1940; and commissioned 29 October 1940.

Service history
Kaskaskia cleared Boston, Massachusetts on 19 November 1940 for Pearl Harbor, Hawaii, arriving 3 January 1941. She transported oil between West Coast ports and Pearl Harbor, making six cruises before 7 August, when she made an oil run to Johnston Island. The oiler returned to Mare Island 10 September for overhaul and repairs. In San Francisco when the Japanese made their surprise Attack on Pearl Harbor, Kaskaskia immediately began preparations to join the Service Force in the Pacific.

World War II
Sailing from San Diego, California, on 6 January 1942, Kaskaskia commenced fueling operations en route before arriving Pago Pago 20 January. For the next six months she operated out of Nom-a refueling the ships engaged in the violent struggle to stem the Japanese advance. The oiler arrived Kodiak, Alaska, 3 July with a cargo of oil and fuel to be used in the Aleutian Islands campaign. She returned to Wilmington, California, loaded oil and aviation gasoline and continued oil runs to Alaskan ports until she steamed to Nouméa late in March 1943. Kaskaskia supplied many ships, increasing the mobility of the fleet during the successful campaigns in the South Pacific.

Kaskaskia returned to San Pedro 28 July for repairs before resuming her duties at Pearl Harbor 21 September. She transported oil between California and Hawaii until she sailed 25 November to support the Gilbert Islands campaign. Returning to Pearl Harbor 10 December, the oiler resumed her cruises between San Pedro and Hawaii.

As the Navy pushed relentlessly toward Japan, Kaskaskia departed Pearl Harbor 16 January 1944 to support operations in the Marshall Islands. After the Navy had captured the Kwajalein and Majuro Atolls, Kaskaskia supported carrier task forces during their devastating raids on Truk, the Marianas Islands, and Palau Islands in February and March.

The oiler continued fueling operations in the Marshall Islands area until she cleared Majuro 6 June to fuel destroyers and destroyer escorts in the invasion of Saipan. Throughout June and July Kaskaskia remained on hand, assisting the fleet to take Saipee, Guam, and Tinian – important supply areas in the future campaign for the Philippines.

As the Navy fought toward the Philippines, the decision was taken to assault the Palau Islands as a staging area for aircraft and ships during the invasion of Leyte. Kaskaskia departed Manus on 4 September with a task group bound for an assault on Peleliu. She operated in the Palau area until returning Manus 8 October. Her stay was a brief one, however, as she sailed 10 October for Leyte. Prior to the actual landings, she fueled units of the fleet, continuing this vital duty until a beachhead had been established. The oiler returned Ulithi 23 October and made another fueling run to the Philippine area early in November.

After an overhaul at San Diego December 1944 through February 1945, Kaskaskia arrived Kwajalein on 11 March to service the fleet. The oiler cleared Ulithi on 30 March for the fueling area off Okinawa, the last major step before the Japanese homeland itself. Once again the oilers, the unsung heroes of the war, stood by refueling the many ships engaged in the irresistible assault from the sea on Okinawa.

Kaskaskia was relieved of fueling duties off Okinawa, only to be summoned for another important service. She departed Ulithi 3 July to refuel units of the carrier task forces, launching raids on the Japanese Islands of Honshū and Hokkaidō. When the Japanese surrendered, Kaskaskia steamed into Tokyo Bay 10 September with ships of the Occupation Forces. She continued refueling operations in Japan, China, and Formosa for an entire year before arriving San Pedro 28 September 1946.

Korean War
Between 1947 and 1950 she ferried oil and aviation gasoline from the West Coast to the Far East and naval bases in the mid-Pacific. When North Korean troops invaded South Korea, the United States accepted the challenge and ordered its forces to defend the embattled peninsula. Kaskaskia cleared San Diego 16 September to operate out of Sasebo. During October she entered the heavily mined waters off Wonsan, fueling ships blockading and bombarding that key port.

During December she arrived off Hungnam to service ships engaged in evacuation operations in that area. Throughout the harsh winter months, Kaskaskia continued vital fueling missions between Japan and Korea. During the United Nations counteroffensive in the spring of 1951, she also stood by for fueling operations. The oiler returned to Long Beach, California, 27 August for overhaul and operations along the Pacific Coast.

She sailed for the second Korean tour January 1952, arriving Sasebo on 22 January to refuel the ships engaged in the Korean War. In addition to services in Korea, she also supplied units in Japan, Okinawa and Formosa before returning Long Beach 31 July. Overhaul and training preceded her third Korean deployment from 27 December to July 1953. On this tour she supported ships engaged in fire support operations. Returning home 17 August, Kaskaskia underwent overhaul; she then sailed again for the Far East 4 January 1954, operated out of Sasebo and returning San Francisco 12 October. Following coastal operations, the oiler was placed out of commission, in reserve, 8 April 1955.

Kaskaskia was transferred to Military Sealift Command 8 January 1957, and operated in that capacity with a Navy crew until 21 October 1957 when she decommissioned and was turned over to the Maritime Administration 10 December. Kaskaskia was struck from the Navy List 2 January 1959.

1960s
The Berlin Crisis of 1961 necessitated the reactivation of ships and Kaskaskia was reinstated 8 September. Following overhaul and alterations she recommissioned at Hoboken, New Jersey, 6 December. After shakedown operations in the Caribbean, the oiler arrived at Mayport, Florida, on 1 May 1962. Throughout the summer she engaged in exercises off the Florida Coast, and sailed to the Azores to participate in Project Mercury, manned orbital flights. She was in company with the aircraft carrier  during the latter's recovery of Astronaut Walter Schirra 3 October, demonstrating the large role of the Navy in space operations.

Kaskaskia return to Mayport 22 October and two days later sailed to participate in the Cuban blockade. President John F. Kennedy ordered the blockade when the Soviet Union tried to plant offensive missiles only  from the United States. The naval pressure persuaded the Soviet Union to withdraw the missiles, easing the crisis. The oiler returned to operations out of Mayport 21 November.

She cleared Mayport 5 February 1963, for a six-month Mediterranean cruise to refuel ships of the US 6th Fleet, then resumed refueling exercises off Florida for the rest of the year. During 1964 Kaskaskia engaged in fueling operations and exercises off Florida and in the Caribbean, constantly seeking improved methods to increase the mobility of the Fleet.

On 6 January 1965, Kaskaskia sailed for another 6th Fleet deployment. While she was operating in the Mediterranean, her crew worked day and night delivering over 19,000,000 gallons of fuel to 169 ships. Kaskaskia returned to Mayport, 7 June 1965. She operated primarily along the Atlantic Coast and in the Caribbean into 1967. Highlights of this period were service to ships patrolling off the coast of riot-torn Santo Domingo in the summer of 1965, and participation in the recovery team for an unmanned Apollo Program space flight in February 1966.

Kaskaskia completed her final Med Cruise in 1969 prior to her decommissioning.

Kaskaskia was decommissioned for the final time in December 1969 and sold for scrap in September 1970.

Kaskaskia, received nine battle stars for World War II and seven stars for Korean War service.

References

External links  
 
 

 

Cimarron-class oilers (1939)
1939 ships
World War II auxiliary ships of the United States
World War II tankers of the United States
Korean War auxiliary ships of the United States
Cold War auxiliary ships of the United States
Ships built in Newport News, Virginia